

Champions
World Series: Cleveland Indians over Brooklyn Robins (5–2)

Awards and honors
MLB Most Valuable Player Award
 None

MLB statistical leaders

Major league baseball final  standings

American League final standings

National League final standings

Negro league final standings

Negro National League final standings
This was the first season of organized Negro league baseball. The first Negro National League would run for the next decade. The Chicago American Giants, managed by league founder and former player Rube Foster, won the first league pennant.

East (independent teams) final standings
A loose confederation of teams were gathered in the East to compete with the West, however East teams did not organize a formal league as the West did.

Won-loss records were sporadically reported due to lack of interest by the press mainly in New York.
Bacharach claimed the pennant, although Hilldale disputed it.

Events

January – June
January 3 – The New York Yankees purchase outfielder Babe Ruth from the Boston Red Sox for $100,000.
February 13 – A meeting in Kansas City results in the birth of the Negro National League. Rube Foster spearheads the formation of the league, which will consist of eight franchises: Chicago American Giants, Chicago Giants, Cuban Stars, Dayton Marcos, Detroit Stars, Indianapolis ABCs, Kansas City Monarchs and St. Louis Giants.
April 8 - The St. Louis Cardinals release pitcher Red Ames. 
April 14 – Stan Coveleski and the Cleveland Indians hold the St. Louis Browns to five hits in a 5–0 victory at Dunn Field. The Chicago White Sox defeat the Detroit Tigers 3–2 and the Philadelphia Athletics defeat the New York Yankees 3–1 as the road teams win two of the three contests in the season openers in the American League.
April 19 – Babe Ruth enters Fenway Park as a member of the opposing team for the first time in his career as the Boston Red Sox sweep a doubleheader from Ruth and the New York Yankees. Ruth goes three-for-eight with an RBI.
April 25 – High Pockets Kelly drives in three as the New York Giants defeat the Brooklyn Robins 5–2 in the first meeting of the National League's two New York teams.
May 1 – The Brooklyn Robins' Leon Cadore and the Boston Braves' Joe Oeschger pitched 26 innings in a 1–1 tie. Morning rain delayed the start of the game until 3:00 p.m. The Dodgers scored a run in the top of the fifth, a single by Ivy Olson driving in Ernie Krueger. The Braves tied it in the bottom of the sixth with a double by Walt Cruise and a single by Tony Boeckel. The game went into extra innings. No runs were scored for the rest of the game and it was called due to darkness in the 26th inning.
May 2 – Opening day for the Negro National League.
May 3 – Dutch Leonard and the Detroit Tigers defeat the Cleveland Indians 5–1 for their first win of the season versus thirteen losses.
May 14 – Walter Johnson of the Washington Senators records his 300th win.
May 20 – At Griffith Stadium, the Washington Senators and Chicago White Sox go into extra innings tied at three. The ChiSox score two in the fifteenth inning only to be matched by Washington in the bottom of the inning. Chicago then puts up eight runs in the sixteenth to win the game by a final score of 13–5 in sixteen innings. Red Faber pitches all sixteen innings for Chicago.
June 1 – In a slugfest at Dunn Field, the Detroit Tigers defeat the Cleveland Indians 11–10. Detroit's Ty Cobb goes two-for-five with two RBIs and a run scored.
June 24 – Following a 5–3 loss to the Cincinnati Reds, the Philadelphia Phillies fall into last place in the National League. With the Philadelphia A's having been in last place since the 13th, both Philadelphia teams spend the rest of the season in last.
June 28 – The Philadelphia Athletics defeat the Washington Senators 6–2 to end an 18-game losing streak. After giving up two runs on two hits and a walk in the first inning, A's starter Slim Harriss cruises the rest of the way for the complete game victory.

July – September
July 1 – Six weeks after recording his 300th, Walter Johnson pitches the only no-hitter of his career, as the Washington Senators top the Boston Red Sox, 1–0.
July 27 – The Washington Senators defeat the Cleveland Indians 19–6. Indians starter Ray Caldwell lasts just 1.1 innings, and is replaced by George Uhle, who gives up four hits and a walk in only a third of an inning of work. Tony Faeth picks up the third out of the second inning to stop the bleeding after the Senators have plated twelve runs. In all, the Senators collect 22 hits as every starter, including pitcher Eric Erickson collects at least one hit.
August 13 – The New York Yankees complete a three-game sweep of the Cleveland Indians to move within a half game of first place.
August 16 – Cleveland Indians shortstop Ray Chapman is struck in the head by a pitch from the New York Yankees' Carl Mays in a game at the Polo Grounds. He dies twelve hours later from a fractured skull, making it the only fatal field accident in Major League Baseball history. His death leads to the banning of the spitball.
September 6 - The Cleveland Indians purchase the contract of Joe Sewell from the New Orleans Pelicans of the Southern Association. Sewell will become the Indians starting shortstop for the next ten years, replacing Ray Chapman, who perished as the result of an on-field beaning days prior. 
September 10 – Hall of Fame Cleveland Indians shortstop Joe Sewell makes his major league debut in a 6–1 loss to the New York Yankees.
September 15 – In the second game of a double header with the Boston Braves, Hall of famer Pie Traynor makes his major league debut at shortstop for the Pittsburgh Pirates.
September 17
The Detroit Tigers' Bobby Veach and New York Giants' George Burns hit for the cycle, the first time it happened twice on the same day, according to the Elias Sports Bureau. Veach finished 6-for-6, adding two singles, as Burns added a second double to his cycle in New York's 4–3 win over the Pittsburgh Pirates in ten innings. Two separate players would not hit for the cycle on the same day until 2008, when the feat was duplicated by Stephen Drew and Adrián Beltré for the Arizona Diamondbacks and Seattle Mariners, respectively.
The Detroit Tigers defeat the Boston Red Sox, 13–12, in 12 innings, despite a major-league record 20 BoSox receiving walks. Eight Tigers also walk to set another ML record of 28 walks in an extra-inning game.
St. Louis Browns first baseman George Sisler goes four-for-five in the Browns' 17–6 victory over the Philadelphia Athletics to raise his average to .400. Sisler will end the season with a .407 batting average.
September 25
After having spent most of the season in the minors, and having logged only ten innings pitched all season, Pittsburgh Pirates pitcher Jimmy Zinn pitches all twelve innings in the Pirates' 2–1 extra innings victory over the St. Louis Cardinals. Zinn gives up just six hits in his twelve innings of work.
The Boston Red Sox defeat the Philadelphia Athletics 4–2, handing Connie Mack's team their 100th loss of the season.
September 27 – Babe Ruth hits two home runs, and accounts for all three runs scored in the New York Yankees' 3–0 victory over the Philadelphia Athletics. The two home runs bring his season total to 53. He hits his 54th, and final, home run two days later.

October – December
October 1 – The Chicago Cubs' Pete Alexander pitches 17 innings to earn his National League leading 27th victory. Only one of the two runs Alexander surrenders to the St. Louis Cardinals is earned, lowering his ERA to 1.91 for the season, which also leads the league.
October 2
Jim Bagby and the Cleveland Indians defeat the Detroit Tigers 10–1 for Bagby's 31st victory of the season.
At Forbes Field, the Pittsburgh Pirates and Cincinnati Reds play the last major league tripleheader, with Cincinnati winning the first two games, 13–4 & 7–3, and Pittsburgh winning the third 6–0 in six innings.
October 5 – The Cleveland Indians defeat the Brooklyn Robins, 3–1, in Game one of the 1920 World Series at Ebbets Field. Indians' pitcher Stan Coveleski gives up a run on five hits and one walk, while striking out three in a complete game effort, while his battery-mate Steve O'Neill led the attack with two doubles and two runs batted in. Rube Marquard is the losing pitcher.
October 6 – The Brooklyn Robins even the World Series at a game apiece with a 3–0 shutout against the visiting Cleveland Indians. Burleigh Grimes is credited with the shoutout, holding Cleveland to only seven hits and four walks while striking out two. Brooklyn right fielder Tommy Griffith goes 2-for-4 with two RBI. Jim Bagby, the losing pitcher, gave up three runs and seven hits in six innings of work.
October 7 – The host Brooklyn Robins beat the Cleveland Indians, 2–1, to take a 2–1 advantage in the World Series. The Robins took an early 2–0 lead in the bottom of the first inning, when leadoff hitter Ivy Olson walked and Tommy Griffith reached base on an error, followed by RBI-singles by Zack Wheat and Hy Myers. The only Cleveland run came in the fourth, after Tris Speaker doubled to left field and scored on an error. Robins' starter Sherry Smith pitched all the way, giving up an unearned run on three hits and two walks, while striking out two. Ray Caldwell was credited with the loss.
October 9 – The Cleveland Indians even the World Series at two games a piece, with a 5–1 victory against the Brooklyn Robins at League Park. For the second time pitcher Stan Coveleski silenced the Brooklyn hitters for nine innings, giving up a run on five hits while striking out four and walking one. Bill Wambsganss hit 2-for-4 with an RBI and scored twice, while Tris Speaker went 2-for-5 with two runs and George Burns drove in two runs. Coveleski helped himself with a single and a run, while Larry Gardner and Elmer Smith drove in a run apiece. The only Brooklyn damage came in the fourth inning after a single by Jimmy Johnston and a RBI-double from Tommy Griffith.  The Robins used four pitchers, as starter Leon Cadore lasted just one inning and was credited with the loss.
October 10 – At League Park, the Cleveland Indians beat the Brooklyn Robins 8–1 in Game 5 of the World Series to take a 3–2 lead in the Classic, in one of the most unusual games in Series history. This game recorded the only triple play ever made in postseason play, the first Series grand slam, and the first Series home run hit by a pitcher. The triple play was unassisted and turned by Cleveland second baseman Bill Wambsganss, while the grand slam was hit by Indians outfielder Elmer Smith and the home run belted by Cleveland starter Jim Bagby, who earned the victory. Beside this, Brooklyn outhit Cleveland, 13-to-12, in a lost cause. Burleigh Grimes was charged with the loss.
October 11 – The Cleveland Indians put themselves one win away from their first World Championship title, after beating the Brooklyn Robins, 1–0, in Game 6 of the World Series at Cleveland League Park. Facing his former team, Duster Mails pitched a sterling three-hit shutout with four strikeouts and two walks. The only run of the game came in the bottom of the sixth inning, when Tris Speaker hit a two-out single and scored on a double by George Burns. The lack of run support by the Robins made a hard-luck loser out of their starter Sherry Smith, who gave up a run on seven hits in a complete-game defeat.
October 12 – The Cleveland Indians defeated the visiting Brooklyn Robins, 3–0, in Game 7 of the World Series, to clinch their first World Championship five games to two. Stan Coveleski earned the shutout and his third victory of the Series, limiting the Robins to five hits and striking out one without walks, to reach a minuscule 0.67 ERA in three complete games. The Indians scored his first run in the bottom of the fourth inning, when Larry Gardner singled and scored on a two-out error. An inning later, Charlie Jamieson singled and scored on a two-out triple by Tris Speaker. The last run came in the seventh, when Coveleski scored on a double by Jamieson. Burleigh Grimes was the loser, after allowing all three runs on seven hits in seven innings. 
October 22 – Eight members of the Chicago White Sox are indicted for supposedly throwing the 1919 World Series. Although considered heavy favorites to win the Series, the White Sox lost to the Cincinnati Reds in eight games.
November 12 – MLB owners unanimously elect Kenesaw Mountain Landis as sole commissioner of Major League Baseball for seven years, abolishing the National Baseball Commission. The owners' action comes in direct response to the Black Sox Scandal, which threatens the integrity of the game. Landis agreed on the condition that he would be the sole commissioner, with final authority over the players and owners. Landis remains a federal judge with his $7,500 federal salary deducted from the baseball salary of $50,000.

Births

January
January 2 – Cliff Dapper
January 4 – Walter Ockey
January 6 – Early Wynn
January 7 – Dixie Howell
January 8 – Bert Kuczynski
January 10 – Max Patkin
January 15 – Steve Gromek
January 16 – Ray Poole
January 16 – Roy Talcott
January 17 – Jay Heard
January 20 – Sam Hairston
January 26 – Dick Mauney
January 27 – Eddie Shokes

February
February 2 – Zeb Eaton
February 8 – Buddy Blattner
February 11 – Boyd Bartley
February 14 – Marie Kazmierczak
February 17 – Gertrude Ganote
February 20 – Frankie Gustine
February 22 – Karl Drews
February 23 – Roy Valdés
February 26 – Danny Gardella
February 27 – Connie Ryan

March
March 3 – Dick Adkins
March 9 – James Bizzle
March 13 – Frank Biscan
March 18 – Mickey Rutner
March 20 – Twila Shively
March 21 – Mabel Holle
March 23 – Tetsuharu Kawakami
March 25 – Sam Lowry
March 27 – Joe Tuminelli
March 28 – Fred Hancock
March 28 – Babe Martin
March 30 – Irene Ruhnke
March 31 – Dave Koslo

April
April 8 – Dick Adams
April 19 – John O'Neil
April 24 – Dixie Howell
April 26 – Ron Northey
April 28 – Red Treadway

May
May 3 – Dan Bankhead
May 10 – Mickey Grasso
May 11 – Gene Hermanski
May 16 – Dave Philley
May 20 – Helen Fox
May 22 – Pinky Woods
May 23 – Francisco José Cróquer
May 24 – Vern Curtis

June
June 9 – Sal Madrid
June 10 – Johnny Podgajny
June 12 – Jim Colzie
June 13 – Héctor Rodríguez
June 16 – Eddie Malone
June 20 – Red Barbary
June 22 – Walt Masterson
June 23 – Deacon Donahue
June 26 – Jean-Pierre Roy
June 28 – Bert Shepard

July
July 1 – Paul Lehner
July 3 – Al Montgomery
July 3 – Paul O'Dea
July 6 – Jay Avrea
July 13 – Frank Hiller
July 14 – Bryan Stephens
July 15 – Theresa Kobuszewski
July 16 – Larry Jansen
July 18 – Eddie Kazak
July 26 – Eddie Bockman
July 26 – Sibby Sisti
July 29 – Erv Dusak
July 31 – Fred Bradley

August
August 3 – Jim Hegan
August 3 – Vic Johnson
August 4 – Bob Keegan
August 5 – Eddie Lukon
August 17 – Vern Bickford
August 18 – Bob Kennedy
August 21 – Ben Cardoni
August 21 – Whitey Platt
August 21 – Gerry Staley
August 23 – Kaoru Betto

September
September 3 – Sandy Consuegra
September 4 – Catherine Bennett
September 5 – Gene Bearden
September 9 – George Kissell
September 12 – Andy Seminick
September 13 – Ed Sudol
September 18 – Paul Gillespie
September 18 – Ed Hanyzewski
September 22 – Larry Eschen
September 22 – Bob Lemon
September 23 – Marino Pieretti
September 24 – Otis Davis
September 30 – Lyman Linde

October
October 2 – Joe B. Scott
October 2 – Spec Shea
October 8 – George Metkovich
October 20 – Pat McGlothin
October 20 – Bill Ramsey
October 22 – Jim Hickey
October 23 – Vern Stephens
October 26 – Bud Byerly
October 28 – Artie Wilson
October 29 – Lenna Arnold

November
November 2 – Dick Sisler
November 2 – John Sullivan
November 4 – Val Heim
November 8 – Wally Westlake
November 9 – Bill Mueller
November 9 – Homer Spragins
November 9 – Dick Whitman
November 10 – Russ Kerns
November 11 – Joe Murray
November 21 – Stan Musial
November 23 – Jake Jones
November 26 – Bud Sheely
November 27 – Johnny Schmitz

December
December 1 – Charlie Ripple
December 2 – Beatrice Arbour
December 6 – Gus Niarhos
December 15 – Eddie Robinson
December 17 – Mike Schultz
December 20 – Julio González
December 21 – Bill Werle
December 27 – Dutch McCall
December 28 – Leslie Aulds

Deaths

January–March
February 2 – Frank Quinn, 43, outfielder for the 1899 Chicago Orphans of the National League.
February 5 – Tom Catterson, 35, outfielder who played from 1908 through 1909 for the Brooklyn Superbas of the National League.
February 5 – Ed Siever, 44, pitcher who posted an 83–83 record and a 2.60 earned run average for the Detroit Tigers and St. Louis Browns, while leading the American League pitchers with 1.91 ERA in 1902.
February 6 – Jack Lapp, 35, backup catcher who hit .263 in nine seasons for the Philadelphia Athletics (1908–1915) and Chicago White Sox.
February 11 – Ray Boyd, 33, pitcher who played from 1910 to 1911 with the AL St. Louis Browns and NL Cincinnati Reds.
February 12 – Mike Goodfellow, 53, National League outfielder for the 1887 St. Louis Browns and the 1888 Cleveland Blues.
February 13 – John Shoupe, 68, pitcher and infielder in part of three seasons for the Troy Trojans (NL, 1879),  St. Louis Brown Stockings (AA, 1882) and Washington Nationals (UA, 1884).
February 14 – Andy Sullivan, 35, shortstop for the 1904 Boston Beaneaters of the National League.
March 1 – Harry Jordan, 47, pitcher who went 1–2 with a 4.15 ERA for the Pittsburgh Pirates from 1894 to 1895.
March 5 – Alex Farmer, 42, catcher for the 1908 Brooklyn Superbas of the National League.
March 10 – Charlie Briggs, 59,  second baseman and outfielder who played for the Chicago Browns of the Union Association during the 1884 season.
March 11 – Ed Poole, 44, National League pitcher who played from 1902 through 1904 for the Pittsburgh Pirates, Cincinnati Reds and Brooklyn Superbas.

April–June
April 2 – Matty McIntyre, 39, outfielder for the Philadelphia Athletics, Detroit Tigers and Chicago White Sox between 1901 and 1912, who led the American League in runs, singles and times on base in the 1908 season.
April 3 – Aaron S. Stern, c. 65, executive with the Cincinnati Red Stockings during the 1880s.
April 18 – George McMillan, 56, Canadian outfielder for the 1890 New York Giants of the National League.
May 1 – Joe Leonard, 25, third baseman for the Pittsburgh Pirates, Cleveland Indians, and Washington Senators between the 1914 and 1920 seasons.
May 8 – Bill McTigue, 27, pitcher who went 2–5 in 27 games with the Boston Rustlers/Braves (1911/1912–1913) and Detroit Tigers (1916).
May 23 – Doc Kennedy, 66, National League catcher who hit .260 in 160 games for the Cleveland Blues and Buffalo Bisons from 1879 to 1883.
June 10 – Martin Flaherty, 66, sporting goods dealer who came out of the stands to play one game for the 1881 Worcester Ruby Legs.
June 19 – Ed Barry, 37, pitcher for the Boston Americans from 1905 through 1907.

July–September
July 19 – John Hinton, 44, third baseman for the 1901 Boston Beaneaters of the National League.
July 20 – Bill O'Neill, 40, Canadian shortstop for the Boston Americans, Washington Senators and Chicago White Sox between 1904 and 1906, who committed six errors in a single game in 1904 to become the only 20th-century big-leaguer to accomplish this dubious feat.
July 23 – Buttercup Dickerson, 62, outfielder for eight teams from 1878 to 1885. Officially the first Italian American to play Major League Baseball.
August 1 – Frank Norton, 75, outfielder/third baseman for the 1871 Washington Olympics of the National Association.
August 4 – Frank Fennelly, 60, shortstop for four different teams from 1884 to 1890, who led the National League for the most RBI in 1885
August 12 – Elmer Horton, 48, pitcher for the 1896 Pittsburgh Pirates and the 1898 Brooklyn Bridegrooms of the National League.
August 17 – Ray Chapman, 29, shortstop for the Cleveland Indians since 1912 who batted .300 three times, led American League in runs and walks in 1918.
August 27 – Toby Lyons, 51, pitcher for the 1890 Syracuse Stars of the American Association.
August 29 – Jimmy Peoples, 56, catcher who played from 1884 through 1889 for the Cincinnati Red Stockings, Brooklyn Grays/Bridegrooms and Columbus Solons.
August 31 – John Ricks, 52, third baseman for the St. Louis Browns of the National League in the 1891 and 1894 seasons.
September 5 – Jerry Turbidy, 68, shortstop who played for the Kansas City Cowboys of the Union Association in 1884.
September 11 – Bill Hallman, 53, second baseman, mainly with the Phillies, who batted .300 and scored 100 runs four times each
September 17 – Charlie Eden, 65, outfielder in parts of four parts for the Chicago White Stockings, Cleveland Blues and Pittsburgh Alleghenys, who led the National League in total bases and extrabase hits in 1879.
September 23 – Doc Curley, 46, second baseman for the 1899 Chicago Orphans of the National League.
September 28 – Phil Reardon, 36, outfielder for the 1906 Brooklyn Superbas of the National League.
September 29 – Mark Creegan, 50, outfielder for the 1884 Washington Nationals of the Union Association.

October–December
October 2 – Walter Hackett, 63, shortstop who played for the 1884 Boston Reds in the Union Association and the 1885 Boston Beaneaters in the National League.
October 9 – Carl Vandagrift, 37, utility infielder for the 1914 Indianapolis Hoosiers of the Federal League.
November 30 – Lou Meyers, 60, catcher/outfielder for the 1884 Cincinnati Outlaw Reds of the Union Association.
December 9 – George Browne, 44, outfielder for seven different teams in a span of eleven seasons, and a member of the 1905 New York Giants World Champions.
December 16 – Dick Bayless, 37, right fielder for the Cincinnati Reds in 1908.
December 27 – Harvey Cushman, 43, pitcher for the 1902 Pittsburgh Pirates.

References